The Council for the Affairs of the Province of Quebec, more commonly called the Legislative Council of Quebec (but not to be confused with the later institution with that same name), was an advisory body constituted by section XII of the Quebec Act of 1774. Together with the representative of the Crown (the Governor, Lieutenant-Governor or the temporary Administrator of the province), it acted, between 1774 and 1791, as the legislature of the old Province of Quebec.

Powers 
The Council had the "Power and Authority to make Ordinances for the Peace, Welfare, and good Government, of the said Province, with the Consent of his Majesty's Governor, or, in his Absence, of the Lieutenant-governor, or Commander in Chief for the Time being.", excepting the power to:

Eligibility 
Section VII of the Quebec Act opened the door of all provincial offices to Roman Catholic subjects. The section exempted Catholics from taking the Test Oath (the abjuration of the Catholic faith) and made them take an alternative oath of allegiance to the British Crown:

Because of this special oath they were required to vow, Canadian Catholics, who formed the immense majority of the population in the province, were permitted to take a more direct part to the legislation of their native country. In practise however, Catholic Legislative Councillors remained a minority in the Council from its creation in 1774 to its abolition in 1791.

Composition 
Councillors numbered between at least seventeen and no more than twenty-three. In 1775, Colonial Secretary Lord Dartmouth instructed Governor General Guy Carleton to call in these individuals to fill in the Council:
 Hector Theophilus de Cramahé, Lieutenant Governor
 Hugh Finlay
 Thomas Dunn
 James Cuthbert 
 Colin Drummond
 François Lévesque
 Edward Harrison
 John Collins
 Adam Mabane
 Gaspard-Joseph Chaussegros de Léry
 Paul-Roch de Saint-Ours 
 Pécaudy de Contrecœur
 George Waters Allsopp
 Charles-François Tarieu de La Naudière
 La Corne Saint-Luc
 Alexander Johnstone
 Conrad Gugy
 François-Marie Picoté de Belestre
 Charles-Régis Des Bergères de Rigauville
 John Fraser

Some of these members had been sitting on the first Council of Quebec constituted by Governor General James Murray in 1764 to advise on all matters of State. About 12 years later, in May 1787, the Council's composition was:
 Hector Theophilus de Cramahé,
 William Smith,
 Edward Harrison,
 Adam Mabane,
 Gaspard-Joseph Chaussegros de Léry,
 John Fraser,
 William Grant,
 François Baby,
 Samuel Johannes Holland
 René-Amable Boucher de Boucherville,
 Hugh Finlay,
 John Collins,
 George Pownall
 François-Marie Picoté de Belestre,
 Henry Caldwell
 Paul-Roch de Saint-Ours,
 Joseph-Dominique-Emmanuel Le Moyne de Longueuil
 John Johnson,
 Jean-Baptiste Le Comte Dupré

With the adoption of the Constitutional Act of 1791, the sections of the Quebec Act dealing with the Council, its composition, and powers, were repealed. However, most of the members then sitting on the Council were called into the new Legislative Council of Lower Canada created by the said act.

Notes

References 
 
 Quebec Act or  14th year of the reign of George III, chapter 83 (U.K.), 1774

See also 
 Constitutional history of Canada

Legal history of Canada
Political history of Quebec
1774 establishments in the Province of Quebec (1763–1791)
Parliaments of Canada
Province of Quebec